Wargnies-le-Petit is a commune in the Nord department in northern France.

Heraldry

Population

See also
Communes of the Nord department

References

Wargnieslepetit